Notre Dame Catholic Secondary School (sometimes referred to as Dame or abbreviated to ND) is located in Brampton, Ontario, Canada and operates under the Dufferin-Peel Catholic District School Board (DPCDSB).

Elementary Feeder Schools
 Sacred Heart
 St. Agnes
 St. Cecilia
 ***St. Leonard 
 St. Joachim
 St. Stephen

Please note that for the 2021-22 school year all St. Leonard staff and students are housed at St. Rita Elementary School located at 30 Summer Valley Drive in Brampton until the fire restoration and construction is completed and safely to attend the original St. Leonard site.

History 
The school was established in 1983, opening with eight teachers. It moved to its present site in 1990
.

Religion
As a Catholic school, Notre Dame requires students to take several religion classes throughout their high school career. It also has its own chapel where students are welcome to pray or visit during their lunch periods and after school. The chapel and many other activities concerning the school's faith are overseen by Notre Dame's current chaplain, Genevieve Anderson. In 2012, she was awarded the annual Brian J. Halferty Chaplaincy Award for Meritorious Service to School Chaplaincy in the Province of Ontario

Athletics
The school participates in several athletic competitions as the Knights. In 2004, the ND Knight's football team was promoted to the Peel Region's Tier 1 football league and have since won four ROPSSAA championships (2003, 2006, 2007, 2011). Notre Dame has over two dozen other sports teams including volleyball, basketball, rugby, soccer, and fast pitch. In 2012, as well as a ROPSSAA title in senior boys' football, the senior girls' volleyball won a title, and the senior girls' basketball team won a silver medal.

Academics
Notre Dame offers courses in the International Baccalaureate (IB) program. IB students at Notre Dame are able to take courses in higher level English, chemistry, and history, as well as standard level French, mathematics, physics, and biology. In addition to these subjects, IB students must participate in the compulsory course Theory of Knowledge. Students are also required to engage in 150 hours of community service.

Various Notre Dame IB classes have had the special opportunity to attend TEDxIB at York School in Toronto. Notre Dame has been represented at the conference by Adrienne Mallari in 2011 and by Ewalina Jeyanesan in 2012.

Community activism
Students take part in a semi-annual food drive, consistently donating at least 10,000 pounds of non-perishable food and other commodities; these are then given to a local food bank. One student in 2008 managed to collect over 1.2 tonnes of food. That year, Notre Dame as a whole collected about 16,308 pounds of food for the Ste. Louise Outreach Centre. The school has since escalated in their participation in this event, setting for itself a current record of over 42,000 pounds of food collected in one drive.

Notable alumni
Jeff Adams, wheelchair track Canadian Paralympian
Phil Oreskovic, NHL and OHL player
Melissa Grelo, Canadian Television Personality cohost of The Social (Canadian TV series) and Your Morning on CTV
Steven Bednarski, historian and actor
Trey Anthony, executive producer and star of Da Kink In My Hair
Dave Thomas (basketball), former National Basketball League of Canada basketball player
Tory Lanez, rapper/singer
Steven Halko, NHL player
Atiba Hutchinson, professional Canadian soccer player
Fernand Kashama, CFL player
Kalonji Kashama, CFL player
Jerome Messam, CFL player
Zach Pop, Major League Baseball player
Jamaal Westerman, NFL and CFL player
Jabar Westerman, CFL player
Shaquille Johnson, CFL player

See also
List of high schools in Ontario

References

External links
 Official school website
 DPCDSB profile

High schools in Brampton
Catholic secondary schools in Ontario
1983 establishments in Ontario
Educational institutions established in 1983
International Baccalaureate schools in Ontario